On is the fifth studio album from Japanese electronica/rock duo Boom Boom Satellites, released on May 17, 2006. The album was released in two editions: a regular edition and a limited edition that included a DVD.

On the Oricon rankings, the album reached a peak rank of 8 and charted for 12 weeks.

Track listing

DVD track listing

External links
 Boom Boom Satellites official website
 'On' review by Keikaku.net

2006 albums
Boom Boom Satellites albums